Earle L. "Buddy" Bunker (September 4, 1912 – January 29, 1975) was a photographer for the Omaha World-Herald and one of the two winners of the 1944 Pulitzer Prize for Photography.

Bunker began his career with the Omaha Bee-News in 1929.  In 1937, the Bee ceased publication when William Randolph Hearst sold it to the Omaha World-Herald.  Bunker spent the rest of his career with the World-Herald.

Bunker won the Pulitzer for a photograph entitled "Homecoming" of a World War II soldier returning home to greet his family.  Lieutenant Colonel Robert Moore had been awarded the Distinguished Service Cross for leading his battalion against Erwin Rommel's Panzers in North Africa. He had been away from his family for sixteen months.  Bunker waited over twenty-four hours for Moore's train to reach the station in Villisca, Iowa so he could take the photograph.

References

1912 births
1975 deaths
20th-century American photographers
Pulitzer Prize for Photography winners
20th-century American non-fiction writers